Kokhav Michael (lit. Star of Michael) is a moshav in southern Israel. Located between Kiryat Gat and Ashkelon, it falls under the jurisdiction of Hof Ashkelon Regional Council.

History
The moshav was founded in 1950 by immigrants from Iraq on the land  of the depopulated  Palestinian  village of Kawkaba (from which the moshav takes the first part of its name; the second half is from Michael Sobell a British philanthropist). They were joined by immigrants from Argentina in 1962.)

References

Moshavim
Populated places established in 1950
Iraqi emigrants to Israel
Iraqi-Jewish culture in Israel
Populated places in Southern District (Israel)
1950 establishments in Israel